The Griffon Fauve de Bretagne (English: Fawn Brittany Griffon) is a breed of dog of the scenthound type, originating in France in the region of Brittany.

Appearance 
The Griffon Fauve de Bretagne is a medium-sized dog, 48 to 56 cm (19-22 ins, same for males and females) at the withers, with a distinctive rough (shaggy) pale coat, long drop ears, and a long tail carried up and in a slight curve. The body is short backed. The breed should appear bony and muscular. Colour of the coat can be any shade of fawn from golden to red.

History 
Grand Fauve de Bretagnes were used in packs for hunting wolves and wild boar, and Francois I was known to keep a pack. With the elimination of wolves in the 19th century, they nearly became extinct and examples were crossed with Briquet Griffon Vendéens to create the smaller Griffon Fauve de Bretagne. 

In 1949, Marcel Pambrun founded the Club de Fauve de Bretagne to save the remains of the breed that had been kept alive by a few farmers and hunters. Since the 1980s, the Griffon Fauve de Bretagne and the derived breed, the Basset Fauve de Bretagne, have been successfully restored in numbers and are popular hunting dogs.

The breed is a good hunting dog, still used in France to hunt boar, but is also a good family dog. Examples of the Griffon Fauve have been exported to other countries, where they are promoted as a rare breed for those seeking a unique pet.

Health and temperament
No unusual health problems or claims of extraordinary health have been documented for this breed. The breed's ideal temperament is described in the breed standard as being wily and tenacious as a hunter on all terrains, but sociable and affectionate with people. Temperament of individual dogs may vary.

See also
 Dogs portal
 List of dog breeds
 Dog terminology
 Griffon Bleu de Gascogne
 Basset Fauve de Bretagne
 Anglo French and French Hounds

References

External links 
 Search The Open Directory Project (DMOZ) links for clubs and information about the Griffon Fauve de Bretagne

Dog breeds originating in France
FCI breeds

Rare dog breeds
Scent hounds